Jim Gutterson (1 July 1939 – 18 July 2008) was an Australian rules footballer who played with Footscray in the Victorian Football League (VFL).

Gutterson, a fullback, came from Chelsea originally and made a total of seven appearances for Footscray in the 1961 and 1962 VFL seasons. He won the reserves best and fairest award, the Gardiner Medal, in 1962.

He also played for three Victorian Football Association clubs, Moorabbin, Brighton-Caulfield and Prahran.

References

1939 births
Australian rules footballers from Victoria (Australia)
Western Bulldogs players
Moorabbin Football Club players
Brighton Football Club players
Prahran Football Club players
Chelsea Football Club (Australia) players
2008 deaths